Rio Verde (Portuguese for "green river") is a river of Goiás state in central Brazil. It is a tributary of the Paranaíba River which is the right headstream of the Paraná River.

See also
 List of rivers of Goiás
 List of tributaries of the Río de la Plata

References

 Brazilian Ministry of Transport

Rivers of Goiás